The 1913 Invercargill mayoral election was held on 30 April 1913 as part of that year's local elections.

Former mayor Duncan McFarlane was elected again. His opponent, Andrew Bain, improved on his performance from the previous election but was still unsuccessful.

Results
The following table gives the election results:

References

1913 elections in New Zealand
Mayoral elections in Invercargill